Tetrafluoromethane, also known as carbon tetrafluoride or R-14, is the simplest perfluorocarbon (CF4). As its IUPAC name indicates, tetrafluoromethane is the perfluorinated counterpart to the hydrocarbon methane. It can also be classified as a haloalkane or halomethane. Tetrafluoromethane is a useful refrigerant but also a potent greenhouse gas. It has a very high bond strength due to the nature of the carbon–fluorine bond.

Bonding
Because of the multiple carbon–fluorine bonds, and the high electronegativity of fluorine, the carbon in tetrafluoromethane has a significant positive partial charge which strengthens and shortens the four carbon–fluorine bonds by providing additional ionic character. Carbon–fluorine bonds are the strongest single bonds in organic chemistry. Additionally, they strengthen as more carbon–fluorine bonds are added to the same carbon. In the one carbon organofluorine compounds represented by molecules of fluoromethane, difluoromethane, trifluoromethane, and tetrafluoromethane, the carbon–fluorine bonds are strongest in tetrafluoromethane. This effect is due to the increased coulombic attractions between the fluorine atoms and the carbon because the carbon has a positive partial charge of 0.76.

Preparation 
Tetrafluoromethane is the product when any carbon compound, including carbon itself, is burned in an atmosphere of fluorine. With hydrocarbons, hydrogen fluoride is a coproduct. It was first reported in 1926. It can also be prepared by the fluorination of carbon dioxide, carbon monoxide or phosgene with sulfur tetrafluoride. Commercially it is manufactured by the reaction of hydrogen fluoride with dichlorodifluoromethane or chlorotrifluoromethane; it is also produced during the electrolysis of metal fluorides MF, MF2 using a carbon electrode.

Although it can be made from a myriad of precursors and fluorine, elemental fluorine is expensive and difficult to handle. Consequently,  is prepared on an industrial scale using hydrogen fluoride:
CCl2F2 + 2 HF → CF4 + 2 HCl

Laboratory synthesis
Tetrafluoromethane and silicon tetrafluoride can be prepared in the laboratory by the reaction of silicon carbide with fluorine.
 SiC + 4 F2 → CF4 + SiF4

Reactions
Tetrafluoromethane, like other fluorocarbons, is very stable due to the strength of its carbon–fluorine bonds. The bonds in tetrafluoromethane have a bonding energy of 515 kJ⋅mol−1. As a result, it is inert to acids and hydroxides. However, it reacts explosively with alkali metals. Thermal decomposition or combustion of CF4 produces toxic gases (carbonyl fluoride and carbon monoxide) and in the presence of water will also yield hydrogen fluoride.

It is very slightly soluble in water (about 20 mg⋅L−1), but miscible with organic solvents.

Uses
Tetrafluoromethane is sometimes used as a low temperature refrigerant (R-14). It is used in electronics microfabrication alone or in combination with oxygen as a plasma etchant for silicon, silicon dioxide, and silicon nitride. It also has uses in neutron detectors.

Environmental effects 

Tetrafluoromethane is a potent greenhouse gas that contributes to the greenhouse effect. It is very stable, has an atmospheric lifetime of 50,000 years, and a high greenhouse warming potential 6,500 times that of CO2.

Tetrafluoromethane is the most abundant perfluorocarbon in the atmosphere, where it is designated as PFC-14. Its atmospheric concentration is growing. As of 2019, the man-made gases CFC-11 and CFC-12 continue to contribute a stronger radiative forcing than PFC-14.

Although structurally similar to chlorofluorocarbons (CFCs), tetrafluoromethane does not deplete the ozone layer because the carbon–fluorine bond is much stronger than that between carbon and chlorine.

Main industrial emissions of tetrafluoromethane besides hexafluoroethane are produced during production of aluminium using Hall-Héroult process. CF4 also is produced as product of the breakdown of more complex compounds such as halocarbons.

Health risks 
Due to its density, tetrafluoromethane can displace air, creating an asphyxiation hazard in inadequately ventilated areas. Otherwise, it is normally harmless due to its stability.

See also 
 Trifluoromethane
 Octafluoropropane

References

External links 

National Pollutant Inventory – Fluoride and compounds fact sheet
Data from Air Liquide
Vapor pressure graph at Air Liquide
MSDS at Oxford University
Protocol for measurement of tetrafluoromethane and hexafluoroethane from primary aluminium production
Chemical and physical properties table
 WebBook page for CF4

Nonmetal halides
Perfluoroalkanes
Halomethanes
Refrigerants
Greenhouse gases